DZRM (1278 AM) is a radio station owned and operated by the Philippine Broadcasting Service. The station's studios and offices are Located at the 4th Floor, PIA/Media Center Building, Visayas Ave., Brgy. Vasra, Diliman, Quezon City, and its transmitter at Brgy. Marulas, Valenzuela.

Since October 2020, the station airs daily (except Sundays) from 6:00am to 8:00pm, with few programs and music automation for the rest of the schedule.

History

The station was launched in 1987 as Radyo Maynila (the brand was previously used at 918 kHz during the Marcos regime prior to EDSA Revolution) under the helm of former actor and BBS-PBS interim director Jose Mari Gonzales. Gonzales ordered that all BBS radio station will give their respective identities including Radyo ng Bayan (918 kHz), Sports Radio (738 kHz) and DZRP-Radyo Pagasa.

In the late-1990s/early 2000s, the station was reformatted as PBS's general information radio station under the name Radyo Magasin. It held a cultural-oriented format. It primarily focused on news, current events, and Philippine culture. Its broadcasting format was akin to the format of a printed magazine, thus its name.

From 2007 and 2009, DZRM was home of Spanish cultural magazine show, Filipinas, Ahora Mismo.

On September 17, 2017, Radyo Magasin officially signed off, after almost 30 years of broadcasting. Its programming merged with DZSR's programming on  Radyo Pilipinas Dos, which was launched the next day. The defunct station's audio streaming space, meanwhile, was then converted to DWFO's audio portal on November 1 after it started a series of tests broadcasts.

On October 5, 2020, DZRM returned on air. The following week, it began simulcasting DepEd TV programming as part of the country's distance learning initiative amid the COVID-19 pandemic until June 2022.

References

DZRM
News and talk radio stations in the Philippines
Philippine Broadcasting Service
Radio stations established in 1987